Urbit is a decentralized personal server platform. The platform seeks to deconstruct the client-server model in favor of a federated network of personal servers in a peer-to-peer network with a consistent digital identity (an ID that remains the same when its underlying public key changes). The design seeks to give users control over their own computing by fixing the underlying issues that cause existing services on the web to centralize, notably: spam, system administration complexity, and development complexity.

Overview

The Urbit software stack consists of a set of programming languages ("Hoon," a high-level functional programming language, and "Nock," its low-level compiled language); a single-function operating system built on those languages ("Arvo"); a runtime implementation of that operating system ("Vere"), public key infrastructure, built on the Ethereum blockchain ("Azimuth"), for each instance of the operating system to participate in a decentralized network; and the decentralized network itself, an encrypted, peer-to-peer protocol running on top of the User Datagram Protocol.

The 128-bit Urbit ID space consists of 256 "galaxies" (2^8), 65,280 "stars" (2^16 - 256 galaxies), 4,294,901,760  "planets" (2^32 - 256 (galaxies) - 65,280 (stars)), and 2^64 - 2^32 "moons" with the rest of the space used for "comets".

Each galaxy can spawn 255 stars (2^8 - 1) and each galaxy and star can spawn 65,535 planets (2^16 - 1). Though spawning galaxy planets is currently disabled by Azimuth. 

In addition, each galaxy, planet, and star can spawn 2^32 - 1 "moons" which are IDs that are subsidiary to the parent's ID.

The remaining large amount of address space is for "comets" which exist for use as temporary IDs (keys cannot be rotated) for users to test out the network.

Galaxies, Stars, and Planets can all be used on the network as permanent identities, but Galaxies and Stars have additional abilities.

Galaxies serve a governance role with each owner getting a vote "on documents and proposals for changes to the Ethereum contracts that govern the Urbit address space." They are also the root nodes of the urbit network hierarchy and today handle all urbit traffic routing.

Stars will eventually assist in routing traffic alongside Galaxies, but today they primarily spawn planets and act as the default source of system updates to those planets.

Planets are the most common permanent identity - they have keys that can be rotated, but no other special features.

Comets can be spawned by anyone via the urbit runtime "Vere". They are randomly created from the available comet address space which is large enough that accidentally spawning the same one twice is not necessary to worry about. Comets are 'temporary' primarily because their keys cannot be rotated separately from the ID name, and they cannot be 'breached' (have their state reset on the network).

Having a large, but limited set of IDs that have a low, but non-zero cost makes urbit resistant to spam since creating large amount of IDs when blocked is not economically viable (since comets and abusive IDs can be trivially blocked). 

All IDs can be used to install (and distribute) applications. All IDs can communicate with other IDs on the urbit network. The most used application on urbit currently is a group chat application developed by Tlon.

Co-founder Galen Wolfe-Pauly claims that Urbit can provide a unified interface for applications akin to WeChat, with the critical difference that the end user retains control over their data.

Platform

Background

The Urbit platform was conceived of in 2002 by neo-reactionary blogger Curtis Yarvin.  The company has received seed funding from various investors since its inception, most notably Peter Thiel, whose Founders Fund, with venture capital firm Andreessen Horowitz invested $1.1 million in the Tlon Corporation to help build out Urbit further. The platform has been described as "complicated for even the most seasoned of functional programmers".

OS1
Urbit OS1 launched in April 2020. This consisted of a group messaging app, a message board, a note-taking system, and several simple apps such as a clock and a weather meter.

Politics and controversy 

In 2015, Yarvin's invitation to the Strange Loop conference was rescinded; the conference organizer said Yarvin's "mere inclusion and/or presence would overshadow the content of his talk." In 2016 after Urbit founder Curtis Yarvin was invited to the functional programming conference LambdaConf, five speakers and three sponsors withdrew their participation due to their stated opposition to Yarvin's political views.

The source code and design sketches for the project alluded to some of Yarvin's views, including initially classifying users as "lords," "dukes," and "earls." Yarvin and Tlon rejected any ideological associations with the project. Andrea O'Sullivan of libertarian magazine Reason described Urbit as having a "libertarian ethos".

Yarvin departed Tlon in 2019. In a blog post about his departure, Yarvin said Urbit "is not designed as a political structure".

See also
 Web3

References

External links 

 
 Tlon.io - Corporate website

Blockchains
Computing platforms
Internet technology companies of the United States